Two-man bobsleigh at the 1994 Winter Olympics took place on 19 and 20 February 1994 at Lillehammer Olympic Bobsleigh and Luge Track.

Results

References

Bobsleigh at the 1994 Winter Olympics